Krystal Bodie (born January 3, 1990) is a Bahamian sprinter from Nassau, Bahamas who competed in the 100m and 100m Hurdles. She attended St. Augustine's College in Nassau, Bahamas, before going on to compete for Southwest Mississippi Community College and Auburn University where she was coached by Henry Rolle. Bodie competed at the 2008 World Junior Championships in Athletics in Bydgoszcz, Poland and the 2014 Commonwealth Games in Glasgow, Scotland.

Bodie is a multi medalist at the CARIFTA Games.

Personal bests

References

External links
 World Athletics Bio
 Auburn Bio

1990 births
Living people
Bahamian female sprinters
Bahamian female hurdlers
People from Nassau, Bahamas
Sportspeople from Nassau, Bahamas
Auburn Tigers women's track and field athletes
Commonwealth Games competitors for the Bahamas
Athletes (track and field) at the 2014 Commonwealth Games
Bahamian expatriate sportspeople in the United States
Auburn University alumni
Junior college men's track and field athletes in the United States